Shia College is a college located in old Lucknow, Uttar Pradesh, India. It is affiliated with the University of Lucknow and one of the institutes of higher education in India.

Overview 

Shia college was established in 1919. Over a period of 100 years of its existence the college has contributed immensely to Indian society with its impressive alumni comprising academicians, politicians, bureaucrats and other distinguished citizens. Although The college was established just a year before the Lucknow University came into existence, it was initially affiliated to Allahabad University. The College consists of two teaching campuses viz, Sitapur Road Campus and Victoria Street Campus.

Brief history
The idea of starting a Shia College was formulated in AISC's 1910 session, the scheme was floated in March 1914 and the decision of starting a degree college at Lucknow was taken in 1915. In 1917 Governor James Meston laid foundation stone for it, and it was completed between 1928–34. Donations came from all members of Shia community, the major shares from, taluqedars & clergy like Nawab Kazilbash (Shia College was his brainchild), Nawab Rampur, Raja Mahmudabad (he was initially opposed to idea of Shia College), Najmul Hasan, etc. Shia College was established on 25 October 1917.

But due to government restrictions it initially started functioning as a school in the premises of Bada Imambara in 1919. In 1922 it became Intermediate College, teaching started with subjects in Humanities and Social Sciences while Natural Sciences was introduced in 1932. In 1947 the college was allowed to start degree classes in science, when the University of Lucknow decided  to permit the teaching of Science out side the premises of Canning College. Later on Bachelor in 1960, Bachelor of Laws in 1970, Bachelor of Commerce in 1972, B.Sc. Computer Science in 1989. The College attained Post-Graduate level in 1995 with M.A. in Urdu; later on M.A. in Sociology in 1996, M.Com. in Applied  Economics in 2005, M.Sc. in Zoology and M.Com.in Pure  Commerce in 2006, M.A. in Journalism & Mass Communication in 2007, M.Sc./M.A. in Statistics in 2008. Professional management course Bachelor of Business Administration in International Business was started in 2005.

College administration
The college administration comprises,
 Board of Trustees
 Managing Committee
 College Committee
 SHIACTA
 Procotorial Board

Notable principals & board members

Principals
 Syed Sibte Hasan Naqvi (d. 1935), ex-principal
 Syed Mohammad Waris Hasan Naqvi (d. 11 May 2008), ex-principal

Board members
 Syed Ali Zaheer (1896-1983), president of the College Management Committee
 Syed Muzaffar Husain Rizvi (1932 – Dec 1987), founding member of the governing board
 Syed Ali Nasir Saeed Abaqati, ex-board member
Syed Husain Nasir Saeed Abqati sahab ansar abqati.board member and senior member of management committee Shia PG College and allied institutions

Notable alumni
 Rasheed Turabi (1908–1973), an Islamic scholar, religious leader, public speaker, poet and philosopher.
 Arif Mohammad Khan (b. 18 November 1951), an Indian politician, currently the Governor of Kerala, 3 times MP of Lok sabha and erstwhile cabinet minister.
 Syed Mahmood Naqvi (1941-2009), Geochemist, former director of Natiobal Geophysical Research Institute, Hyderabad
 Syed Wajih Ahmad Naqvi, Indian marine scientist and the former director of the National Institute of Oceanography

References

External links
 
 
 
 
 
 
 
 

nawabs
Universities and colleges in Lucknow
University of Lucknow
Educational institutions established in 1925
1925 establishments in India